Monica Ann Neumann von Héthárs, also known as Baroness Monica von Neumann, (née Ford; 15 Jun 1964 – 5 March 2019), was an American socialite, philanthropist, and businesswoman. She worked as a fashion model and dancer before marrying John Neumann Ritter von Héthárs in 1985.

Early life 
Monica von Neumann was born into an African-American working-class family in Detroit, Michigan. As a child she moved with her mother to Los Angeles. She studied dance at the Roland Dupree Dance Academy. She attended Fairfax High School in Fairfax District, Los Angeles.

Career and philanthropy 
Von Neumann danced professionally before getting married, going on tour with Nina Simone and Devo. She also worked as a model for Yves Saint Laurent and Dior, walking in runway shows and standing in for fittings at ateliers in Paris.

In 2010 she launched the luxury home-goods retailer Baroness von Neumann Candles, which sold high-end scented candles. The candle logo was the Von Neumann family crest. In December 2010 she was a guest on BET's The Mo'Nique Show.

In 2013 she was considered for a spot as a cast member of the American reality television series Real Housewives of Beverly Hills. She reportedly met with producers but ended up not joining the cast.

In February 2013 von Neumann, along with Daphne Guinness and Lynn Ban, donated a collection of her shoes to the Museum at Fashion Institute of Technology's Shoe Obsession exhibit. Von Neumann was featured in the documentary God Save My Shoes, which followed extreme shoe collectors.

She was a patron of Inner-City Arts and the Boys & Girls Clubs of America. She was also involved with Hollyrod Foundation, an organization that offers support to families with children that have autism. As a patron of the organizations March To The Top and AINA, von Neumann traveled to Kenya and assisted in establishing an orphanage.

Personal life 
When she was eighteen years old she was introduced to John Neumann Ritter von Héthárs, the son of Heinrich Neumann Ritter von Héthárs, by Sonny Bono at a dinner party in Palm Springs. She began a relationship with Ritter von Neumann, who was the first importer of Volkswagens to the United States. After they got engaged, she attended a finishing school in Switzerland. She and Ritter von Neumann married in 1985. They had one daughter, Dorian. Her husband's family, the von Neumanns, are a Hungarian Jewish family that was elevated into the nobility by the Austrian emperor. While a branch of her husband's family held the rank of Freiherr (baron), her husband did not. He held the hereditary title Ritter, which is the German equivalent to a baronet or hereditary knight. Her husband died from cancer in 2003.

Prior to his death, Von Neumann's husband allegedly had a son from an extramarital affair with Charlotte Vega. In 2010 she was involved in a legal battle against Charlotte's son, John Vega, regarding his paternity.

Death 
Monica von Neumann died on 5 March 2019 due to health complications. She reportedly was in financial trouble at the time of her death. She is buried at Hillside Memorial Park Cemetery.

References 

1964 births
2019 deaths
21st-century American businesspeople
African-American company founders
African-American female dancers
African-American female models
American socialites
American women company founders
American company founders
American women philanthropists
Austrian untitled nobility
Hungarian nobility
Burials at Hillside Memorial Park Cemetery
Businesspeople from Detroit
Dancers from Michigan
Monica
20th-century American businesspeople
20th-century American businesswomen
21st-century American businesswomen
20th-century American philanthropists
20th-century African-American women
20th-century African-American people
21st-century African-American women
21st-century African-American people
20th-century women philanthropists